The following is a list of art groups in Nanjing, Jiangsu province of China:

Jiangsu Province Kun Opera
Jiangsu Jiangnan Theater
Jiangsu Chinese Opera Institute
Jiangsu Symphonic Orchestra
Nanjing Acrobatic Company
Nanjing Arts Institute Chinese Orchestra
Nanjing Arts Institute Symphonic Orchestra
Nanjing Arts Institute Experiment Dance Troupe
Nanjing Chinese Orchestra
Nanjing Dance Company
Nanjing Secondary School Students Symphonic Orchestra
Nanjing First High School Symphonic Band
Nanjing Youth and Adolescence Dance Troupe
Nanjing Youth Dance Troupe
Nanjing Peking Opera Troupe
Nanjing University Chinese Orchestra
Nanjing University Symphonic Orchestra
Nanjing University of Science and Technology Wind Orchestra
Nanjing Xiaobaihe Art Troupe
Nanjing Xiaohonghua Art Troupe (Nanjing Primary School of Art)
Qianxian Dance Troupe
Qianxian Theater

Nanjing Art Groups
Nanjing Art Groups
Nanjing art groups